Olearia axillaris, commonly known as coastal daisy-bush, coast daisy-bush or coastal daisybush is a species of flowering plant in the family Asteraceae and is endemic to coastal areas of Australia. It is an erect, bushy shrub with densely cottony-hairy branchlets, aromatic, linear to narrowly elliptic or narrowly lance-shaped to egg-shaped leaves with the narrower end towards the base and small white and yellow, daisy-like inflorescences.

Description
The edges of the leaves are rolled under, the surfaces covered with woolly grey hairs, densely so on the lower surface.

Taxonomy
Coastal daisy-bush was first formally described in 1836 by Augustin Pyramus de Candolle who gave it the name Eurybia axillaris in Prodromus Systematis Naturalis Regni Vegetabilis. In 1865, Ferdinand von Mueller changed the name to Aster axillaris in Fragmenta Phytographiae Australiae and in 1867 George Bentham changed that name to Olearia axillaris in Flora Australiensis. The specific epithet (axillaris) means "axillary", referring to the flowers.

Distribution and habitat
Olearia axillaris grows in heath and scrub, mainly in near-coastal areas of New South Wales south from Sussex Inlet, the entire coase of Victoria and most of South Australia, south from Shark Bay in Western Australia and in north-eastern Tasmania.

References 

axillaris
Asterales of Australia
Flora of New South Wales
Flora of South Australia
Flora of Tasmania
Flora of Victoria (Australia)
Eudicots of Western Australia
Taxa named by Augustin Pyramus de Candolle
Plants described in 1836